The 1981 NBA playoffs were the postseason tournament of the National Basketball Association's 1980–81 season. The tournament concluded with the Eastern Conference champion Boston Celtics defeating the Western Conference champion Houston Rockets 4 games to 2 in the NBA Finals. Cedric Maxwell was named NBA Finals MVP.

The playoffs are notable for being the third and final time to date that a team with a losing record advanced to the NBA Finals (the St. Louis Hawks did it first in 1957 with a 34–38 record, the Minneapolis Lakers did it in 1959 with a 33–39 record), as the Rockets won their first Western Conference title despite having a 40–42 record.

This was the only time in NBA history in which two teams with a losing record played each other in a Conference Finals, though the 1957 Western Division Finals did feature two teams with losing records. The Rockets and the Kansas City Kings, both with a 40–42 record, played in the Western Conference Finals which saw the Rockets prevail 4–1.

The Kings' playoff series victories over the Blazers and Suns were their last in Kansas City. Their last playoff series in Kansas City was a 3-game sweep in the first round in 1984 by the Lakers. They moved to Sacramento after the 1984–85 season and didn't win a playoff series representing northern California until 2001.

The Pacers became the last former ABA team to make their playoff debut, but were quickly swept by the 76ers 2–0.

This is the last year to date that an NBA playoff game was played in March.

The Celtics replicated their 1968 comeback by beating the Sixers in 7 after trailing 3–1. This is the only time a team came back from a 3–1 series deficit to win against the same team twice.

This was the last time the Los Angeles Lakers were not the number one seed in the Western Conference until 1991.

Bracket

First round

Eastern Conference first round

(3) Philadelphia 76ers vs. (6) Indiana Pacers

This was the first playoff meeting between the Pacers and the 76ers.

(4) New York Knicks vs. (5) Chicago Bulls

This was the first playoff meeting between the Bulls and the Knicks.

Western Conference first round

(3) Los Angeles Lakers vs. (6) Houston Rockets

This was the first playoff meeting between the Rockets and the Lakers.

(4) Portland Trail Blazers vs. (5) Kansas City Kings

This was the first playoff meeting between the Trail Blazers and the Kings.

Conference semifinals

Eastern Conference semifinals

(1) Boston Celtics vs. (5) Chicago Bulls

This was the first playoff meeting between the Celtics and the Bulls.

(2) Milwaukee Bucks vs. (3) Philadelphia 76ers

This was the second playoff meeting between these two teams, with the Bucks winning the first meeting.

Western Conference semifinals

(1) Phoenix Suns vs. (5) Kansas City Kings

 The Kings became the 2nd NBA road team to win Game 7 after leading series 3–1 and the 1st #5 seed to eliminate #1 seed.

This was the third playoff meeting between these two teams, with the Suns winning the first two meetings.

(2) San Antonio Spurs vs. (6) Houston Rockets

This was the second playoff meeting between these two teams, with the Rockets winning the first meeting.

Conference finals

Eastern Conference finals

(1) Boston Celtics vs. (3) Philadelphia 76ers

John Hollinger of ESPN.com ranked this  as the greatest playoff series in NBA history 

This was the 16th playoff meeting between these two teams, with the Celtics winning eight of the first 15 meetings.

In Game 4, the Sixers led 93–86 midway through the fourth quarter, when Cedric Maxwell scored and drew the foul on Darryl Dawkins. He completed the three-point play. Larry Bird pushed the ball up court after a Sixers turnover. He pulled up and hit a mid-range shot to make it 93–91. Then after a Dawkins miss, Bird grabbed the rebound and threw a quick outlet pass that led to a fast-break layup to tie it at 93.

The teams traded baskets for four straight trips before the Sixers took a 101–97 lead with 4 minutes left. They traded baskets again, with Julius Erving finishing the scoring for the 76ers with a dunk over Robert Parish and two free throws for a 107–103 lead with 2:30 left. With over a minute left, Caldwell Jones lost his shoe in a scramble and played defense with it in one hand. Nate Archibald took advantage and drove right at Jones, who allowed him a free lane for an easy lay-up to make it 107–105 (he held the shoe instead of tossing it away to have both hands free or using it to his advantage to block the shot).

In the final minute, Philadelphia committed a shot-clock violation, giving Boston a chance to tie or go ahead. But Parish's turn-around shot rolled out. The rebound was tipped between two Sixers players and almost went out-of-bounds before Erving got it to Maurice Cheeks with 30 seconds left. The Sixers used as much time as they could, but Bobby Jones missed a runner and Maxwell got the rebound with 7 seconds left. He passed it to Archibald, who forced a half-court pass to Bird that Bobby Jones intercepted to end the game and give Philadelphia a 3–1 series lead.

Game 5 was back in Boston, and the Celtics were in a must-win situation. Bobby Jones' block on Gerald Henderson led to a fast-break lay-up by Andrew Toney to give the 76ers a 103–99 lead. The teams traded buckets the next four trips until a missed jumper by Bird and two Dawkins free throws made it 109–103 with 1:51 left. Dawkins got a steal, but Maxwell's game-saving block prevented a Philadelphia lay-up and led to an Archibald three-point play with 1:20 left that made it 109–106. Boston then got another block by Parish. The Sixers recovered the ball, but lost it out-of-bounds seconds later.

Bird's lay-up made it 109–108 with 47 seconds left. After a Sixers timeout, Bobby Jones' inbounds pass was deflected by Bird, then tipped by Dawkins. Bird reached for the ball while Jones put his hands up to show he didn't touch it as the ball went out-of-bounds. The referees gave the 76ers the ball, much to Bird's dismay. He argued to the refs that he didn't touch it. They met to make a decision. After a few minutes, possession was awarded to the 76ers, and Jones cleanly inbounded to Dawkins. He passed to Hollins, who gave it to Toney, who almost lost and palmed the ball, but the referees let play continue despite the jeers from the crowd. Toney tried to get the ball to Erving, but M.L. Carr deflected it out-of-bounds.

The last 29 seconds had a few moments that were reminiscent of earlier Boston Garden lore. Erving stood in almost the same spot where Hal Greer had his pass stolen by John Havlicek to seal the 1965 Eastern Division Finals. However, the 76ers were ahead this time. Erving inbounded the ball, but it got past Jones and started rolling along the sideline. Bird grabbed it and drove to the hoop with only Jones to stop him. He beat Bird to the hoop to challenge his floater. Carr got the rebound and missed, but a foul was called on Erving. With the season on the line and 20 seconds left, Carr hit both to give Boston a 110–109 lead.

After a timeout, Lionel Hollins took the ball up court and passed to Bobby Jones, who passed it to Erving. With Maxwell defending and Bird coming to double-team, Erving passed back out to Jones. With the clock ticking away, he drove and missed a floater with 7 seconds left. Carr got the rebound and ran the clock down to 1 second before Erving fouled him. Like Game 5 of the 1976 NBA Finals, the fans and media ran onto the court thinking it was over. Once it was cleared, Carr had to shoot the free throws. He hit the first to make it 111–109, then intentionally missed the next two (the 3-to-make-2 rule). Dawkins got the rebound and called timeout. The crowd huddled around the court with 1 second left and Jones standing in nearly the same spot that Curtis Perry stood before passing the ball to Gar Heard. This time, things turned out better as Parish stole it to keep Boston alive. But the Sixers still led 3–2 and were going back home.

In Game 6, Philadelphia was looking to clinch at home, and it looked like they would, as they were up by 17 at one point. But with the season on the line yet again, the Celtics fought back. With the game tied at 87 late in the fourth, Erving was blocked from behind by Bird underneath the basket. On the Celtics' end of the court, Archibald missed a 15-footer, but followed his own miss and went right back up for a layup. Cheeks hit a reverse lay-up to tie it at 89. He fouled out on the next possession. Parish hit both free throws to give Boston a 91–89 lead. After Boston failed to capitalize on a Sixers turnover, Erving tied it at 91 with a layup over Parish. After Bird traveled, Dawkins was fouled and hit both free throws to give the Sixers a 93–91 lead. This was short-lived, as Parish hit a baseline jumper and drew the foul. He completed the 3-point play to give Boston a 94–93 lead with under 3 minutes left.

A Dawkins dunk and two Archibald free throws further swayed the lead. A Hollins miss gave Boston a chance to build the lead, but Parish left after being called for an offensive foul, his sixth. That brought in rookie Kevin McHale to guard Dawkins. The Sixers went right at him, but he played good defense and forced Dawkins to miss. Bird hit an 18-footer to give Boston a 98–95 lead with 1 minute left. Toney answered by hitting a 20-footer with 54 seconds and stealing the ball from Bird with 29 seconds left and the Sixers down 1. He went for the lead, but McHale blocked it and got the ball with 14 seconds left. He passed the ball ahead to Archibald and Boston played keep away. The Sixers didn't foul until 2 seconds left. Maxwell made both foul shots to give Boston a 100–97 lead. After a timeout, the Sixers inbounded at midcourt.

The first attempt was deflected out-of-bounds by Bird, but 2 seconds still showed on the clock. However, it moved the position of the inbounds pass upcourt, making Billy Cunningham decide to take their final timeout to draw up a play from the new position. McHale's defense prevented Jones from inbounding to Toney in the corner, but he found Dr. J at the top of the key, who was immediately fouled by Archibald to prevent him from handling the ball cleanly to even try to shoot a 3. So with 1 second left, Erving had two foul shots while down 3. The Sixers still had a chance if he made the first and missed the second. He missed the first. Erving hit the second to make it 100–98. After a timeout, the Celtics inbounded from midcourt and tied the series at 3 heading back home for Game 7.

Like the last three games, Game 7 came down to the wire. It finally looked like the 76ers' night as they led by 7 with 4:34 left. Maxwell and Archibald brought Boston within 4 from the line. A Parish steal and a turn-around jumper cut it to 2. Parish blocked Dawkins' lay-up, which led to a fast-break, but Maxwell lost his balance and traveled. "Tiny" Archibald got a steal leading to a Bird dunk attempt that missed, but was fouled by Erving; his fifth. Bird missed the first, but made the next two to tie it at 89 with 2:51 left.

The 76ers' next trip downcourt was a wild one. Dr. J almost traveled, a pass got deflected out of bounds, Caldwell Jones got the offensive rebound off a Dr. J miss, and a Bird block on Erving, led to a scramble for the ball that saw bodies fly all over the court. It eventually rolled to Hollins, who got it off before the shot clock expired, but missed. A battle for the rebound almost saw Bird tip it out-of-bounds, but as the ball bounced precariously near the baseline, he grabbed it and got it to "Tiny" to give Boston a chance to take the lead.

On Boston's possession, Parish threw up an airball that went out-of-bounds off Hollins, giving the Celtics a second chance. However, "Tiny" missed a long-range 2, and the rebound bounced off Boston. The Sixers then put the ball in the hands of Erving and Dawkins as they traded the ball back and forth to wear down the Celtics defense. Parish, Maxwell, and Bird played tough defense, and forced a Dawkins miss that Bird rebounded. He led the fast-break himself and hit a mid-range bank shot to give Boston a 91–89 lead with 1:03 left.

With the 76ers looking to tie or go ahead, Erving's pass was stolen by Carr with 47 seconds left. But Boston was without Archibald, who got injured a couple plays back. Henderson had the ball poked away by Hollins to Cheeks, who kept it on the fast-break. He drove to the basket and got fouled hard on a missed lay-up. He took a few moments to get up. He gutted it out though, and went to the line with a chance to tie it with 29 seconds left. He split the pair to make it 91–90.

The 76ers chose not to foul and played tough defense. Boston used up the entire shot-clock before Carr finally took a shot with 7 seconds. He missed, but Parish momentarily had a series-ending offensive rebound, but lost it. Bobby Jones finally got the rebound and called time with 1 second left. So with a chance to win, he had to inbound the ball with fans, security, and media huddled around the court. With Bird defending, Jones lobbed a pass towards the basket, but it hit the top of the backboard. Cedric Maxwell tipped it to end the series as the Garden crowd stormed the court. Boston became the fourth team in NBA history to overcome a 3–1 series deficit, and the third team to do so in the Conference Finals. This would happen again in 2016 between the Golden State Warriors and Oklahoma City Thunder.

Western Conference finals

(5) Kansas City Kings vs. (6) Houston Rockets

This was the first playoff meeting between the Rockets and the Kings.

NBA Finals: (E1) Boston Celtics vs. (W6) Houston Rockets

 Larry Bird's famous play of following a missed jumper, jumping for the rebound, and switching ball from his right to left hand as his momentum was carrying him out of bounds as he scored.

This was the third playoff meeting between these two teams, with the Celtics winning the first two meetings.

References

External links
 Basketball-Reference.com

National Basketball Association playoffs
Playoffs
Sports in Portland, Oregon

fi:NBA-kausi 1980–1981#Pudotuspelit